Qorahsin It is the land west of the Shebelle River, the name Qoraxsin means West or Galbeed in Somali, this Land is suitable for grazing and farming.

The oral history of the elders says; that Gaalje'el originally lived on the east side of the River, in Hiran, a land that was not good for livestock especially Camels, the Gaalje'el community decided to  move to Qorahsin which is a very good grazing land. At that time Qorahsin was inhabited by Maay clans such as Garre, Hubeer, ShanAleen and Begedi.  Gaalje'el fought a series of battles against these clans and drove them out of the land of the Qorahsin, Among the clans they fought fiercely was the Garre clan, whose fighting had been raging for nearly five centuries.

References 

Landforms of Somalia
Landforms of Ethiopia
Shebelle River